KAYE-FM (90.7 FM) is a radio station broadcasting an Top 40 (CHR) format. Licensed to Tonkawa, Oklahoma, United States. The station is currently owned by Northern Oklahoma College.

References

External links

Active rock radio stations in the United States
AYE-FM